Zoltán "Zoli" Tibor Balogh (December 7, 1953 – June 19, 2002) was a Hungarian-born mathematician, specializing in set-theoretic topology. His father, Tibor Balogh, was also a mathematician.  His best-known work concerned solutions to problems involving normality of products, most notably the first ZFC construction of a small (cardinality continuum) Dowker space.  He also solved
Nagami's problem (normal + screenable does not imply paracompact), and the second and third Morita conjectures about normality in products.

References

External links
Memorial with photograph
Zoli -- Topology Proceedings 27 (2003)
Author profile in the database zbMATH

20th-century Hungarian mathematicians
1953 births
2002 deaths
Topologists